The king asleep in mountain (D 1960.2 in Stith Thompson's motif index system) is a prominent folklore trope found in many folktales and legends. Thompson termed it as the Kyffhäuser type. Some other designations are: king in the mountain, king under the mountain, or sleeping hero.

Examples include the legends of King Arthur, Fionn mac Cumhaill, Charlemagne, Ogier the Dane, King David, Frederick Barbarossa at Kyffhäuser, Constantine XI Palaiologos, Kraljević Marko, Sebastian of Portugal and King Matjaž.

The motifs A 571 "Cultural hero asleep in mountain", and E 502, "The Sleeping Army" are similar and can occur in the same tale. A related motif is the "Seven Sleepers" (D 1960.1, also known as the "Rip Van Winkle" motif), whose type tale is the Seven Sleepers of Ephesus (AT tale type 766).

General features 

King in the mountain stories involve legendary heroes, often accompanied by armed retainers, sleeping in remote dwellings including caves on high mountaintops, remote islands, or supernatural worlds. The hero is frequently a historical figure of some military consequence in the history of the nation where the mountain is located.

The stories gathered by the Brothers Grimm concerning Frederick Barbarossa and Charlemagne are typical of the stories told, and have been influential on many variants and subsequent adaptations. The presence of the hero is unsuspected; until some herdsman wanders into the cave, typically looking for a lost animal, and sees the hero. The stories almost always mention the detail that the hero has grown a long beard, indicative of the long time he has slept beneath the mountain.

In the Brothers Grimm version, the hero speaks with the herdsman. Their conversation typically involves the hero asking, "Do the eagles (or ravens) still circle the mountaintop?" The herdsman, or a mysterious voice, replies, "Yes, they still circle the mountaintop." "Then begone! My time has not yet come."

The herdsman in this story was then supernaturally harmed by the experience: he ages rapidly, he emerges with his hair turned white, and often he dies after repeating the tale. The story goes on to say that the king sleeps in the mountain, awaiting a summons to arise with his knights and defend the nation in a time of deadly peril. The omen that presages his rising will be the extinction of the birds that trigger his awakening.

Europe 

A number of European kings, rulers, fictional characters and religious figures have become attached to this story. Major examples are King Arthur of Britain and Holy Emperor Frederick Barbarossa, Ogier the Dane and William Tell.

Baltic states 

 A motif in Latvian legends involves a castle sinking into ground leaving a hill behind it. Years later someone finds a way into the hill and guesses the name of the castle causing it to rise again and its ruler and his people to return to the living.
 Vytautas the Great in Lithuania is believed he will rise from his grave when the worst danger threatens Lithuania in order to defend the motherland at the last battle.

Britain and Ireland 
 King Arthur (Great Britain and Brittany). According to the legend, Arthur was taken away to Avalon to sleep until he was needed by the people of Britain. Several legends talk of a herdsman who stumbles across a cave on mainland Britain, wherein he finds Arthur sleeping, often with his knights and Excalibur by his side. In a variation on this, sometimes the exploring herdsman finds instead just Arthur's knights, or Sir Lancelot, Guinevere and the knights sleeping in wait on the return of the "Once and Future King". In early Arthurian literature, Arthur references his predecessor Brân the Blessed as having his head placed on a mound overlooking Britain so as to protect it. He wishes to do the same, and later they overlook and protect Britain together.
 Merlin of the Arthurian legend, who is imprisoned in an oak tree by Nimue.
 Thomas the Rhymer is found under a hill with a retinue of knights in a tale from Anglo-Scottish border. Likewise, Harry Hotspur was said to have been hunting in the Cheviots when he and his hounds got holed-up in the Hen Hole (or "Hell-hole"), awaiting the sound of a hunting horn to awaken them from their slumber. Another border variant concerns a party of huntsmen who chased a roebuck into the Cheviots when they heard the sweetest music playing from the Henhole. However, when they entered, they became lost and are trapped to this day.

Wales 

 Brân the Blessed. Referenced as protecting the Isles and overlooking Britain; his head severed and placed on a mound. Arthur later says he wishes to do the same and in early Arthurian literature both guard Britain together.
 Owain Lawgoch, Welsh soldier and nobleman (14th century).
 Owain Glyndŵr, the last native born Welshman to hold the title "Prince of Wales"; he disappeared after a long but ultimately unsuccessful rebellion against the English. He was never captured or betrayed and refused all Royal pardons.
 An unnamed giant is supposed to sleep in Plynlimon.

Ireland 
 Fionn mac Cumhaill is said to sleep in a cave/mountain surrounded by the Fianna (he is differentiated from them because of his large stature). It is told that the day will come when the Dord Fiann is sounded three times and Fionn and the Fianna will rise up again, as strong and well as they ever were. In other accounts he will return to glory as a great hero of Ireland.
 The 3rd Earl of Desmond, who dozes under Lough Gur with his silver-shod horse.
 The 8th Earl of Kildare, who is at temporary rest under the Curragh of Kildare.
 Dónall na nGeimhlach Ó Donnchú, in legend around Co. Kerry.
Cu Chulainn in Nationalist circles in Northern Ireland

England 
 King Harold. In Anglo-Saxon legends he survived the Battle of Hastings and will come one day to liberate the English from the Norman yoke.
 Sir Francis Drake. It is stated that if England is in deadly peril and Drake's Drum is beaten, then Sir Francis Drake will arise to defend England from the sea. According to the legend, Drake's Drum can be heard at times when England is at war or significant national events take place.
 Knights asleep at Alderley Edge in Cheshire. There is an enduring legend of a cavern full of knights in armour awaiting a call to decide the fate of a great battle for England. There is no king named, but there is a wizard involved, who is referred to as Merlin in later versions of the legend.

Caucasus region

Armenia 
 Mher (see Daredevils of Sassoun).

Georgia 
According to legend, Queen Tamar is not dead, but is instead sleeping in a gold wreathed coffin in a mountain. Allegedly, there will come a day when she will wake, and restore Georgia to its medieval glory.

Dutch and German-speaking realm 

Dietrich von Bern, legendary Germanic hero, was spirited away to the dwarf kingdom to return in the time of greatest need.
 Charlemagne, Emperor of future Germany, France, and the Low Countries, rests in the Untersberg near Salzburg (Austria).
 Frederick Barbarossa, Holy Roman Emperor, sleeps in the Kyffhäuser mountain and will rise to save the Empire (Germany).
 Frederick II, Holy Roman Emperor.
 Henry the Fowler, King (Germany).
Widukind, Saxon Duke famous for opposing Charlemagne, is prophesied to return from the Mountain Babylon to liberate the German people.

Switzerland 
 William Tell (Switzerland, in some legends accompanied by two other Tells).

Greek, Hellenistic and Byzantine

Ancient Greece 
 Theseus (Athens).

Byzantine Empire 
 Constantine I, said to have been turned into a stone statue, although not resting within a mountain.
 Constantine XI Palaiologos, the last emperor of the Eastern Roman Empire, said to have been turned into marble and thus was known as "Marmaromenos", "the Marble King".  He was said to be hidden somewhere underground until his glorious return as the Immortal Emperor.
 John III Doukas Vatatzes (also known as "Kaloyannis III'").

Hungarians 

 Csaba, the son of Attila the Hun who is supposed to ride down the Milky Way when the Székelys are threatened.
 King St. Stephen, King St. Ladislaus, King Matthias Corvinus.

Spain 
 Boabdil, last Islamic prince of Granada.
 King Pelayo, Visigothic king of Asturia, credited with beginning the Reconquista.
 King Rodrigo, said to escape from the Moorish invasion and await for "the time of maximum need" to save his people.

Portugal 
 Sebastian I, who Sebastianists hold will one day return on a hazy morning in time of need.

Romania 

 Vlad III the Impaler.
 Stephen III the Great.

Scandinavia 

 Ogier the Dane (Denmark).
 King Olaf II (Norway).
 Väinämöinen, the protagonist of the Finnish national epic Kalevala. At the end of Kalevala, he leaves on a boat, promising to return when he is most needed.
 Knights of Ålleberg (Sweden).

Slavic nations

East Slavic 
 Alexander Suvorov (Russia), Russian generalissimo, sleeps in a deep cave where prayer is heard and icon lamp burns. The legend says Suvorov will come back to save his country from a mortal danger.
 Taras Shevchenko, (Ukraine), Ukrainian poet and painter, believed to be a supernatural hero (charakternik), is said to sleep under his grave mound in Kaniv or even in the Kyiv Pechersk Lavra.

South Slavic 
 Marko Kraljević (Serbia, Macedonia).
 Matija Gubec (Croatia).
 Kralj Matjaž (Slovenia).
 Napoleon Bonaparte was believed to be still alive and hiding in Irkutsk, Russia, gathering an army to return and conquer the world. According to a Romanian bishop Melchisedech, there was a Slavonic sect whose members shared this belief along with a widespread worship of Napoleon.

West Slavic 
 Giewont, a mountain massif which is said to be a sleeping knight (Poland).
 Bolesław the Brave, asleep with a host of knights in a cave hidden somewhere in the Tatra Mountains (Poland). Several different versions of the legend exist, sometimes with a different historical figure involved.
 St. Wenceslas (Václav) of Bohemia (Czech Republic). He sleeps in the Blaník mountain (with a huge army of Czech knights) and will emerge to protect his country at its worst time, riding on his white horse and wielding the legendary hero Bruncvík's sword.

Examples in Asia

Asia minor and Middle East

Iran 
Kay Khosrow, legendary shah of Persia, many of the companions of the Saoshyant are depicted as immortal and asleep, Kay Khosrow then revives each of them one by one to assist the Saošyant in his renovative work.

East Asia

Mongolia 
 A traditional tale of the death of Genghis Khan says he died falling from his horse while being injured, but that whether he died or not is unknown, and he may be merely resting. Every spring and autumn "those who know the secret" of where Genghis is buried are said to put new sets of clothes into his casket and take the old ones out, worn and frayed. Folklore reports another instance of evidence that Genghis would return: every year there is a sacrifice for Genghis Khan in the Ordos and two white horses (the horses of Genghis Khan) appear. In the third year of the Chinese Republic (1914), though, just one horse appeared. When the second horse came, four years later, it had saddle galls. This was taken as evidence that Genghis Khan had been using the horse, and was making ready to appear again.

China 
 A traditional tale of Zhu Youjian survived through the fall of Beijing and will reappear was widely spread in Qing Dynasty.

Japan 
 Kūkai, founder of Shingon Buddhism. He is said to be in deep meditation in a temple on Mount Kōya, Wakayama Prefecture, awaiting the coming of Maitreya, the next Buddha.

Philippines 
 Bernardo Carpio, the "King of the Tagalogs", is said to be trapped in the mountains of Rodriguez, Rizal, east of Metro Manila on Luzon. Legend has it that Carpio, a man of superhuman strength, causes earthquakes as he struggles to break free of his chains.

Tibet 

 Gesar of Ling, believed by the Tibetans to return one day and restore order on Earth.

Vietnam 

 The temple of Trần Hưng Đạo, the supreme commander who defeated Kublai Khan's invasions of Vietnam, housed a sword chest that rung if the nation was in peril, but it also foretold victories.

Examples from the Americas

United States 
 The Pueblo hero-god Montezuma — believed to have been a divine king in prehistoric times, and suspended in an Arizona mountain that bears his image.
 The Sleeping Ute mountain in Colorado is said to have been a "Great Warrior God" who fell asleep while recovering from wounds received in a great battle with "the Evil Ones" (there are many other variants of this legend).
 Tecumseh of the Shawnee.
 Emperor Norton is claimed by several defunct civil rights groups to have been destined to return to the US when the unity of the Republic is at its nadir.
 Some adherents of the QAnon conspiracy theory believe that American figure John F. Kennedy Jr. will one day return to purge corruption from the American government.

Peru 
 The Inkarri (from Spanish Inca Rey, "Inca King") of the indigenous peoples of Peru, who will return one day to restore the Inca Empire. There are two main versions of the myth with several local variations:
 In the first, Inkarri was the last Sapa Inca. He was decapitated by the Spaniards, who buried his head in an unknown location. The head is not dead but hibernating while it regenerates the rest of the body. When the regeneration is complete, Inkarri will return.
 In the second, Inkarri and his wife Qollari were the founders of Cusco. They fled to the Amazon jungle (to a place called Paititi, or variations thereof), where they sleep under rocks and will return one day.

Examples by religion

Judaism 
 King David is depicted in Hayim Nahman Bialik's tale "King David in the Cave" as sleeping along with his warriors deep inside a cave, waiting for the blast of the shofar that will awaken them from their millennia of slumber and arouse them to redeem Israel. This role was not attributed to King David in earlier Jewish tradition.

Christianity 
 St. John the Evangelist – according to the Golden Legend, he is only sleeping in his grave at Ephesus until the coming of the Antichrist, when he would be needed as a witness.

Islam 
 Muḥammad al-Mahdī (Shīʿa motif, identified with the mysterious son of Ḥasan al-ʿAskarī but occasionally other important figures in Shīʿa history like al-Ṭayyib Abū al-Qāṣim), sometimes called The Qāʾim) when identified with a historical figure as opposed to someone yet-to-come, the individual is endowed with unnaturally long lifespan and is said to be in occultation.
al-Ḥākim bi-Amr Allāh (either died or disappeared in 1021 AD at the age of 35), is believed by the Druze to return at the End of Time to rule from Egypt.

Hinduism 
 Viṣṇu is often depicted as asleep, woken up by the other gods asking for his help. His avatar Krishna informs Arjuna in the Bhagavad Gita that he periodically returns to Earth to establish order and justice. The Mahabharata specifically claims that Vishnu will appear in his tenth avatar of Kalki, yet to come, at the end of the Kali Yuga to rule as king.

Sleeping anti-hero and villain 
Sometimes this type of story or archetype is also attached to not-so-heroic figures, who are either simple anti-heroes or fully villains, whose return would mean the end of the world, or whose sleep represents something positive. This kind of archetype is known as the "Chained Satan" archetype. Among examples of this are:
 The Sleeping Giant mountain in Connecticut, United States was said by the local Quinnipiac people to be the demon Hobbomock, sealed by the Great Spirit. One day he would supposedly awaken and destroy the world.
 Artavasdes I of Armenia, who according to Moses of Chorene was chained and cursed to stay eternally chained by his father Artaxias I.
 Loki in Norse mythology was bound by the gods after he engineered the death of Baldr. With the onset of Ragnarök, Loki is foretold to be set free and fight alongside the forces of the jötnar against the gods.
 Dukljan (Serbian mythology).
Typhon and Enceladus in Mount Etna.

See also 

 Honi HaM'agel
 King Arthur's messianic return
 Rip Van Winkle
 Seven Sleepers
 Sidhe
 Stasis
 Suspended animation
 The Longing

References

Bibliography

External links 
 List of other sleeping hero legends

Legendary monarchs
Medieval legends
Comparative mythology
 
Literary motifs
Mythological archetypes